Mehran Karimi Nasseri (1945 – 12 November 2022), also known as Sir, Alfred Mehran, was an Iranian refugee who lived in the departure lounge of Terminal 1 in Charles de Gaulle Airport from 26 August 1988 until July 2006, when he was hospitalized. His autobiography was published as a book, The Terminal Man, in 2004. Nasseri's story inspired the 1993 film Lost in Transit and the 2004 film The Terminal. He returned to living at the airport in September 2022, and died there of a heart attack in November 2022.

Early life
Nasseri was born in the Anglo-Persian Oil Company settlement located in Masjed Soleiman, Iran. His father, Abdelkarim, was an Iranian doctor working for the company which allowed Nasseri to grow up relatively affluently. Nasseri has claimed that he was the result of an illegitimate affair, and that his mother was a nurse from Scotland working in the same place but has also claimed a Swedish mother. However, these claims were never substantiated, and it is most likely that Nasseri's mother was an Iranian homemaker. At age of 28, he arrived in the United Kingdom in September 1973, to take a three-year course in Yugoslav studies at the University of Bradford.

Life in Terminal 1 

Nasseri alleged that he was expelled from Iran in 1977 for protests against the Shah and after a long battle, involving applications in several countries, was awarded refugee status by the United Nations High Commissioner for Refugees in Belgium. This allegedly permitted residence in many other European countries. However, this claim was disputed, with investigations showing that Nasseri was never expelled from Iran.

He was able to travel between the UK and France, but in 1988, his papers were lost when his briefcase was allegedly stolen. Others indicate that Nasseri actually mailed his documents to Brussels while on board a ferry to Britain, lying about them being stolen. Arriving in London, he was returned to France when he failed to present a passport to British immigration officials. At the French airport he was unable to prove his identity or refugee status and so was detained at the waiting area for travelers without papers.

Nasseri's case was later taken on by French human rights lawyer Christian Bourget.
Attempts were then made to have new documents issued from Belgium, but the authorities there would do so only if Nasseri presented himself in person. In 1995, the Belgian authorities granted permission for him to travel to Belgium, but only if he agreed to live there under the supervision of a social worker. Nasseri refused this on the grounds of wanting to enter the UK as originally intended.
Both France and Belgium offered Nasseri residency, but he refused to sign the papers as they listed him as being Iranian (rather than British) and did not show his preferred name, "Sir Alfred Mehran". His refusal to sign the documents was much to the frustration of his lawyer, Bourget. When contacted about Nasseri's situation, his family stated that they believed he was living the life he wanted.

As for what Nasseri did day-to-day during his long stay at Terminal 1 in the Charles de Gaulle Airport, he could be found, day or night, around the Paris Bye Bye bar, where he was journaling, listening to the radio, and / or smoking his gold pipe, or eating a meal at McDonalds, which was bought for him by strangers, or sitting on a red bench in the Terminal's first level, in a deep reflective trance. In other accounts, his luggage was always by his side, as he wrote in his diary or studied economics.

In 2003, Steven Spielberg's DreamWorks production company paid a rumoured US$275,000 to Nasseri for the rights to his story, but ultimately did not use his story in the subsequent film, The Terminal.

Nasseri's 18-year stay at the airport ended in July 2006 when he was hospitalized and his sitting place was dismantled. Towards the end of January 2007, he left the hospital and was looked after by the airport's branch of the French Red Cross; he was lodged for a few weeks in a hotel close to the airport. On 6 March 2007, he was transferred to an Emmaus charity reception centre in Paris's 20th arrondissement. As of 2008, he had been living in a Paris shelter, though in the wake of Nasseri's death in 2022, the Associated Press reported that he had recently returned to live at the airport.

Autobiographical book The Terminal Man 
In 2004, Nasseri's autobiography, The Terminal Man, was published.  It was co-written by Nasseri with British author Andrew Donkin and was reviewed in The Sunday Times as being "profoundly disturbing and brilliant".

Documentaries and fictionalizations 
Nasseri's story provided the inspiration for the 1993 French film Tombés du ciel, starring Jean Rochefort, internationally released under the title Lost in Transit. The short story "The Fifteen-Year Layover", written by Michael Paterniti and published in GQ and The Best American Non-Required Reading, chronicles Nasseri's life. Alexis Kouros made a documentary about him, Waiting for Godot at De Gaulle (2000).

Flight
Nasseri's story was the inspiration for the contemporary opera Flight by British composer Jonathan Dove, and was premiered at the Glyndebourne Opera House in 1998. Flight would go on to win the Helpmann Awards at the Adelaide Festival Theatre in March 2006.

Sir Alfred of Charles De Gaulle Airport
Glen Luchford and Paul Berczeller made the Here to Where mockumentary (2001), also featuring Nasseri. Hamid Rahmanian and Melissa Hibbard made a documentary called Sir Alfred of Charles De Gaulle Airport (2001).

The Terminal
Nasseri was reportedly the inspiration behind the character Viktor Navorski (Tom Hanks), from Steven Spielberg's 2004 film The Terminal; however, neither publicity materials, nor the DVD "special features" nor the film's website mentions Nasseri's situation as an inspiration for the film. Despite this, in September 2003, The New York Times noted that Spielberg had bought the rights to his life story as the basis for The Terminal. The Guardian indicated that Spielberg's DreamWorks production company paid US$250,000 to Nasseri for rights to his story and reported that, as of 2004, he carried a poster advertising Spielberg's film draping his suitcase next to his bench. Nasseri was reportedly excited about The Terminal, but it was unlikely that he would ever have had a chance to see it in cinemas.

Death
Nasseri died of a heart attack on 12 November 2022, at Charles de Gaulle Airport. An airport spokesperson said that Nasseri was homeless and had returned to live in a public area in the airport in September 2022.

See also
List of people who have lived in airports
Statelessness

References

External links
, 26 July 2004, 
 
 
  / 📷 

1945 births
2022 deaths
People from Masjed Soleyman
Stateless people
Homeless people
Iranian refugees
Iranian expatriates in France
Iranian expatriates in the United Kingdom
Charles de Gaulle Airport
Alumni of the University of Bradford